Buhe (Ge'ez: ቡሄ Buhē) is a feast day observed by the Ethiopian Orthodox Tewahedo Church and Eritrean Orthodox Tewahedo Church on 19 August (13 Nahase in the Ethiopian calendar). On this date, the Ethiopian Orthodox Church celebrates the Transfiguration of Jesus on Mount Tabor (Debre Tabor Ge'ez: ደብረ ታቦር).

Observance
Buhe celebrated by Ethiopian Orthodox and Eritrean Orthodox Churches on 19 August (13 Nehase in Ethiopian calendar) in commemoration of Transfiguration of Jesus on Mount Tabor (Debre Tabor in Ge'ez). Buhe is one of old age religious and cultural festival.
 
Observations include people of the neighborhood tie a bundle of sticks together to make a chibo, and set it on fire while singing songs.  The main song is called "Hoya Hoye" with one singer singing while the others follow in a rhythmic way. It involves young boys singing songs of praise outside of people's homes, in exchange for fresh bread called mulmul. The boys then bless the family of the home for the following year.

References 

Ethiopian Orthodox Tewahedo Church
Christian festivals and holy days
August observances